Hans Hjelm (16 December 1926 – 17 August 2006) was a Swedish ice hockey player, best known for representing Hammarby IF and winning two domestic titles with the club. He won the silver medal with Sweden in the 1947 World Championships. Hjelm also played bandy.

Athletic career

Ice hockey
Born and raised in Stockholm, Hjelm started to play ice hockey with Hammarby IF as a youngster. In 1943, at age 17, he made his debut in the senior roster, competing in the top tier Division 1. Hjelm won his first Swedish championship with the club in 1945, scoring the title winning goal in overtime against Södertälje SK, winning 3–2 in the final.

Hjelm made seven international appearances for the Swedish national team. Hjelm won the silver medal with Sweden in the 1947 World Championships.

He played one season with Atlas Diesels IF in the second division in 1948–49, before returning to Hammarby IF. He won his second Swedish championship with the club in 1951, scoring one goal as the side once again beat Södertälje SK with 3–2 in the final.

At the end of his career, Hjelm also represented Saltsjöbadens IF in the second tier for one season, before retiring with Hammarby IF in 1956. In total, he played 185 games for the club and scored 47 goals.

Bandy
Like many other ice hockey players at the time, Hjelm also played bandy with Hammarby IF. He competed in the top tier Allsvenskan for one season in 1946.

References

1926 births
2006 deaths
Ice hockey people from Stockholm
Swedish ice hockey players
Swedish bandy players
Hammarby Hockey (1921–2008) players
Hammarby IF Bandy players